Borin may refer to:

Borin Do, a village in Serbia
Borin Van Loon (born 1952), British illustrator and comic book artist
Davide Borin (born 1989), Italian association football player
Victor Borin, a character in the Netflix series Grand Army

See also
 Boring (disambiguation)
 Boryń (disambiguation)